Roslavl is a town and the administrative center of Roslavlsky District in Smolensk Oblast, Russia. It is a road and rail junction and a market town. Population:

History
Roslavl was founded as Rostislavl in the 1130s or 1140s. The name is likely due to Prince Rostislav of Smolensk, who was the founder of the fortress. It belonged to the Principality of Smolensk. The area belonged intermittently to the Principality of Smolensk and the Grand Duchy of Lithuania. In 1376, Roslavl was transferred to Lithuania and became the center of a principality. It was chartered under Lithuanian rule in 1408. In 1515, it was conquered by the Grand Duchy of Moscow, but in 1618 transferred to Poland. Under Polish-Lithuanian rule Roslavl was part of the Smolensk Voivodeship. In 1667, according to the Truce of Andrusovo, Roslavl was transferred back to Russia. During all this period, it was a fortress at the border, and the fortifications were extensively used. The last time they were in use in 1706, during the Great Northern War. In the course of the administrative reform carried out in 1708 by Peter the Great, the area was included into Smolensk Governorate and remained there until 1929, with the exception of the brief periods between 1713 and 1726, when it belonged to Riga Governorate, and between 1775 and 1796, when Smolensk Governorate was transformed into Smolensk Viceroyalty. It was the center of Roslavlsky Uyezd.

On 12 July 1929, governorates and uyezds were abolished, and Roslavlsky District with the administrative center in Roslavl was established. The district belonged to Roslavl Okrug of Western Oblast, which had its administrative center in Roslavl. On August 1, 1930, the okrugs were abolished, and the districts were subordinated directly to the oblast. On 27 September 1937 Western Oblast was abolished and split between Oryol and Smolensk Oblasts. Roslavlsky District was transferred to Smolensk Oblast. Between August 3, 1941 to September 25, 1943, during WWII, the district was occupied by German troops.

Administrative and municipal status
Within the framework of administrative divisions, Roslavl serves as the administrative center of Roslavlsky District. As an administrative division, it is incorporated within Roslavlsky District as Roslavlskoye Urban Settlement. As a municipal division, this administrative unit also has urban settlement status and is a part of Roslavlsky Municipal District.

Economy

Industry
In Roslavl, there are enterprises producing parts for trucks, electrical equipment, and ceramics, as well as food.

Transportation
A railway connecting Smolensk and Bryansk passes through Roslavl I railway station. Another railway to Kirov (Fayansovaya railway station), branches off east. The line from Roslavl across the border with Belarus to Krychaw is defunct, since traffic across the border has been halted. There is no passenger traffic along the line to Kirov.

The Russian route A130, formerly A101, connecting Moscow with the border of Belarus and continuing to Babruysk, passes through Roslavl. Another road, R120 (formerly A141), which connects Smolensk with Bryansk and Oryol, passes through Roslavl as well. There is a road between Roslavl and Yelnya, as well as local roads with bus traffic originating from Roslavl.

Climate
Roslavl has a warm-summer humid continental climate (Dfb in the Köppen climate classification).

Culture and recreation
There is a local museum in Roslavl, exhibiting archeological, ethnographic, and art collections.

Notable people
Among the natives of Roslavl were sculptors Mikhail Mikeshin and Sergey Konenkov, film director Ilya Frez, athlete Maria Itkina, as well as some ancestors of Fyodor Tyutchev.

Gallery

References

Sources

External links
 The murder of the Jews of Roslavl during World War II, at Yad Vashem website.

Cities and towns in Smolensk Oblast
1137 establishments in Europe
12th-century establishments in Russia
Roslavlsky Uyezd
Holocaust locations in Russia